Talfit is a Palestinian village in the Nablus Governorate in the northern West Bank, located  southeast of Nablus. According to the Palestinian Central Bureau of Statistics (PCBS) census, it had a population of 2,824 in 2007.

Location
It is bordered by Jalud and Qusra to the east, Jurish and Qabalan to the north, Eli, Mateh Binyamin to the west, and Qaryut to the south.

History
Potsherds from the Iron Age II, Persian and Byzantine/Ayyubid eras  have been found.

Röhricht   suggested identifying Talfit  with Tarphin, mentioned in a Crusader text from 1154, but a later author (Abel) preferred to locate it at Kh. Tarfein to the north of Bir Zeit. According to Finkelstein, Kh. Tarfein  better fits the archaeological finds.

Potsherds from the Mamluk era has also been found.

Ottoman era
In 1596, Talfit appeared in Ottoman   tax registers as a village in the Nahiya of Jabal Qubal in the Liwa of Nablus.  It had a population of 12 Muslim households. The villagers  paid a fixed tax-rate of 33,3% on wheat, barley, summer crops, olives, and goats or beehives; a total of 1,500  akçe. Potsherds from the early Ottoman era has also been found here.

In 1838 Edward Robinson noted  Telfit  located in El-Beitawy district, east of Nablus.

The PEF's Survey of Western Palestine noted in 1882 that the place resembled Kabalan, described as  a village of moderate size, on high  ground, surrounded by olive-trees. Talfit was supplied with water from a well called Ain Telfit.

British Mandate era
In the 1922 census of Palestine, conducted by the British Mandate authorities, Talfit  had a population of 352, all Muslims, increasing in  the 1931 census to 464, still all Muslim, in  116 occupied houses.

In the 1945 statistics, Telfit had a population of 610 Muslims,  with 6,258  dunams of land, according to an official land and population survey. Of this, 3,309 dunams were plantations and irrigable land, 1,228 used for cereals, while 49 dunams were built-up land.

Jordanian era
In the wake of the 1948 Arab–Israeli War, and after the 1949 Armistice Agreements,  Talfit came under Jordanian rule.

The Jordanian census of 1961 found 904 inhabitants.

1967-present
After the Six-Day War in 1967,   Talfit  has been under Israeli occupation.

After the 1995 accords, 97% of the village land is classified as Area B land, while the remaining 3% is Area C.

References

Bibliography

External links
Welcome To Talfit
Survey of Western Palestine, Map 14:    IAA, Wikimedia commons 
 Talfit Village Profile, Applied Research Institute–Jerusalem (ARIJ)
Talfit, aerial photo, ARIJ

Nablus Governorate
Villages in the West Bank
Municipalities of the State of Palestine